Anaxias (Ancient Greek: Ἀναξίας means 'command, behest') or Anaxis (Ἄναξις means 'bringing up, raising up') was in Greek and Roman mythology a son of Castor and Hilaeira, and cousin of Mnasinus, with whom he is usually mentioned. The temple of the Dioscuri at Argos contained also the statues of these two sons of the Dioscuri, and on the throne of Amyclae both were represented riding on horseback. In some accounts, he was called Anogon.

Notes

References 

 Apollodorus, The Library with an English Translation by Sir James George Frazer, F.B.A., F.R.S. in 2 Volumes, Cambridge, MA, Harvard University Press; London, William Heinemann Ltd. 1921. ISBN 0-674-99135-4. Online version at the Perseus Digital Library. Greek text available from the same website.
Pausanias, Description of Greece with an English Translation by W.H.S. Jones, Litt.D., and H.A. Ormerod, M.A., in 4 Volumes. Cambridge, MA, Harvard University Press; London, William Heinemann Ltd. 1918. . Online version at the Perseus Digital Library
Pausanias, Graeciae Descriptio. 3 vols. Leipzig, Teubner. 1903.  Greek text available at the Perseus Digital Library.
Sextus Propertius, Elegies from Charm. Vincent Katz. trans. Los Angeles. Sun & Moon Press. 1995. Online version at the Perseus Digital Library. Latin text available at the same website.

Characters in Greek mythology
Messenian mythology